Sarah Dumont (born April 10, 1990) is an American actress and model, best known for playing the lead female role in the film Scouts Guide to the Zombie Apocalypse. She also appeared in the film Don Jon and series The Royals.

Early life and career 
Dumont was born in San Diego, California, and after dropping out of high school she started her career as a fashion model. In 2009, she appeared in the series Melrose Place.

In 2013, Dumont played the role of Sequins in the romantic comedy film Don Jon opposite Joseph Gordon-Levitt. She also appeared in the series Agents of S.H.I.E.L.D..

In 2014, Dumont played the lead role in the film Acid Girls, and then appeared in Dads, The Rebels, Bad Ass 2: Bad Asses, Tbilisi, I Love You, Mixology, Oh, You Pretty Things!, Friends with Better Lives, Playing It Cool, and The League.

In 2015, Dumont played the lead role of Denise Russo in the horror comedy film Scouts Guide to the Zombie Apocalypse along with Tye Sheridan, Logan Miller, Joey Morgan, and David Koechner. The film was directed by Christopher B. Landon, which released on October 30, 2015 by Paramount Pictures. She also appeared in the series The Royals.

Filmography

Film

Television

References

External links 
 

Living people
People from San Diego
Actresses from San Diego
American film actresses
American television actresses
21st-century American actresses
Female models from California
1990 births